Lee Richard (born 1948) is a former Major League Baseball player.

Lee Richard may also refer to:

Lee Richards (disambiguation)